The 1920 New Mexico gubernatorial election was held on November 2, 1920.

Incumbent Republican Governor Octaviano Ambrosio Larrazolo was defeated for renomination. Republican candidate Merritt C. Mechem defeated Democratic nominee Richard H. Hanna with 51.26% of the vote.

General election

Candidates
Richard H. Hanna, Democratic, former Chief Justice of the New Mexico Supreme Court
Merritt C. Mechem, Republican, district judge

Results

References

Bibliography
 
 
 

1920
New Mexico
Gubernatorial
November 1920 events in the United States